Two ships of the Royal Norwegian Navy have borne the name HNoMS Garm, after the Ragnarök hound Garmr:

  was a  launched in 1913 and sunk by German aircraft in 1940.
 HNoMS Garm (K538) was the ex-Canadian   launched in 1943 and transferred to the Royal Norwegian Navy in 1956. Renamed  as a motor torpedo boat support ship in 1965 and decommissioned in 1977.

Royal Norwegian Navy ship names